Prof. John Emaimo (born 18 June 1966) is currently serving his second term as the rector of Federal School of Dental Technology & Therapy, Enugu, Nigeria (the only college of its kind in Nigeria that trains dental technologists, dental therapists and dental nurses).

Education 
John Emaimo had his secondary education at Comprehensive Secondary School, Nnung Obong, Akwa Ibom from 1979 to 1984, where he received the West African Examinations Council certificate in 1984. He then obtained a professional certificate in dental technology from the School of Medical Sciences, Ojo-Lagos (1987-1991, and a first degree in public administration from Ambrose Alli University). He currently holds two master's degrees, in social work and public administration from Lagos State University, Ojo-Lagos (1987-1991). and Ladoke Akintola University of Technology, Ogbomosho, respectively and a PhD in Social work from the University of Jos, Jos. He has several other professional and executive certificates from other universities, notably a Certificate in International Health Consulting from the Liverpool School of Tropical Medicine.

Career 
He worked in the early stage of his career as a dental technologist at the 3rd Division (Nigeria) Medical Centre, Jos and became the head of Dental Technology Services in Abuja. Afterwards he began a lecturing career at the Institute of Development Administrations; a moderated Centre of University of Ibadan Distance Learning Centre as a lecturer II and grew along the ranks at the Institute of Development Administration/Distance Learning Centre, University of Ibadan and was appointed Rector of the Federal School of Dental Technology & Therapy Nigeria, in 2016 - a position he currently occupies.

He won the Most Outstanding and Best Performed Rector of Federal Polytechnics in Nigeria for the Year 2019 and the Ahmadu Bello Distinguished Leadership Award (Northern Youth Council of Nigeria) in the same year.

Professional bodies 
Fellow, Institute of Development Administration of Nigeria
Fellow, Institute of Social Work of Nigeria.
Fellow, Institute of Healthcare Management of Nigeria 
Fellow, Institute of Corporate Administration of Nigeria .

References 

Living people
Nigerian academic administrators
University of Ibadan alumni
Nigerian academics
1966 births